opened in Akita, Akita Prefecture, Japan in 1990.

See also

 List of Historic Sites of Japan (Akita)
 Akita Prefectural Museum
 Akita Senshū Museum of Art

References

External links
  Satake Historical Museum

Buildings and structures in Akita (city)
Museums in Akita Prefecture
Museums established in 1990
1990 establishments in Japan
Satake clan
History museums in Japan